Wilkin Castillo (born June 1, 1984) is a Dominican former professional baseball catcher. He made his major league debut in 2008 for the Cincinnati Reds. He has played in Major League Baseball (MLB) for the Reds and Miami Marlins.

Professional career

Arizona Diamondbacks
Castillo was originally signed as an undrafted free agent in 2002 by the Arizona Diamondbacks. He first played in Arizona's farm system in 2004, mostly in the rookie-level Pioneer League, while also appearing in six Triple-A games. He spent 2005 playing in Class A and spent 2006 in Class A-Advanced, Double-A, and Triple-A. In 2007, he played for the Double-A Mobile BayBears where he had a .302 batting average in 109 games. In 2008, Castillo was named the 14th-best prospect in the Diamondbacks organization, and played 104 games in Triple-A for the Tucson Sidewinders of the Pacific Coast League, batting .254 with six home runs and 47 RBIs.

Cincinnati Reds
On August 14, 2008, Castillo was sent to the Cincinnati Reds as a part of the Adam Dunn trade, which took place August 11. On September 1, he was called up and made his MLB debut the following day against the Pittsburgh Pirates, flying out to left in his one at-bat as a pinch hitter. His first hit was on September 3, a single to right field off T. J. Beam of the Pirates, also as a pinch hitter. Castillo played in 18 MLB games in 2008, with 9 hits in 32 at-bats for a .281 average. He began the 2009 season with the Triple-A Louisville Bats after failing to earn a spot on the Reds' roster. On June 20, he was called up to the Reds and appeared in four games with two hits in three at-bats. He played in a total of 22 games with the Reds over the two seasons, with 11 hits in 35 at-bats for a .314 average.

Minor league and international play
Atlanta Braves
Following the 2010 season, Castillo became a minor league free agent. He signed a minor league contract, with an invitation to spring training, with the Atlanta Braves. He spent the 2011 season with the Triple-A Gwinnett Braves, recording a slash line of .262/.285/.366 with 5 HR and 37 RBI in 80 games.

Colorado Rockies
On December 16, 2011, Castillo signed a minor league contract with the Colorado Rockies and played in Triple-A for the Colorado Springs Sky Sox, slashing .253/.273/.365 with 4 HR and 34 RBI in 74 games.

Los Angeles Dodgers
On November 21, 2012, Castillo signed a minor league deal with the Los Angeles Dodgers. The Dodgers released him at the end of spring training.

Vaqueros Laguna
On May 24, 2013, Castillo was signed to the Mexican League Triple-A Vaqueros Laguna team. In 51 games he hit .378/.419/.562 with 6 home runs and 28 RBIs.

Toros de Tijuana
On April 1, 2014, Castillo was traded to the Toros de Tijuana. He was released on April 12, 2014. In 8 games he hit .182/.206/.273 with 0 home runs and 3 RBIs.

Broncos de Reynosa
On May 28, 2014, Castillo signed with the Broncos de Reynosa of the Mexican Baseball League. He was released on July 1, 2014. In 25 games he hit .215/.284/.333 with 2 home runs and 8 RBIs. 

Pittsburgh Pirates
On January 30, 2015, Castillo signed a minor league contract with the Pittsburgh Pirates. He elected free agency on November 6.

Toronto Blue Jays
On February 26, 2016, Castillo signed a minor league contract with the Toronto Blue Jays, and was assigned to the Triple-A Buffalo Bisons.

New York Yankees
On January 7, 2017, Castillo signed a minor league contract with the New York Yankees. He elected free agency on November 6, 2017.

Long Island Ducks
On March 27, 2018, Castillo signed with the Long Island Ducks of the independent Atlantic League of Professional Baseball. In 20 games he hit .314/.400/.486 with 2 home runs and 12 RBIs.

Second stint with Yankees
On May 24, 2018, Castillo's contract was purchased by the New York Yankees. He elected free agency on November 2, 2018.

Miami Marlins
On February 28, 2019, Castillo signed a minor league contract with the Miami Marlins. He opened the 2019 season with the New Orleans Baby Cakes. His contract was selected by the Marlins on June 21. The next day, in his first MLB game in 10 years and two days, Castillo hit a  go-ahead two-run double in a Marlins 5–3 win over the Philadelphia Phillies. On September 3, Castillo was designated for assignment. He elected free agency on October 14, 2019. 

He re-signed with the Marlins organization on July 31, 2020. Castillo was released by the Marlins on August 18, 2020.

References

External links

1984 births
Living people
Broncos de Reynosa players
Buffalo Bisons (minor league) players
Colorado Springs Sky Sox players
Cincinnati Reds players
Dominican Republic expatriate baseball players in Mexico
Dominican Republic expatriate baseball players in the United States
Gwinnett Braves players
Indianapolis Indians players
Lancaster JetHawks players
Leones del Escogido players
Long Island Ducks players
Louisville Bats players
Major League Baseball catchers
Major League Baseball players from the Dominican Republic
Mexican League baseball catchers
Miami Marlins players
Missoula Osprey players
Mobile BayBears players
New Hampshire Fisher Cats players
New Orleans Baby Cakes players
Scottsdale Scorpions players
Scranton/Wilkes-Barre RailRiders players
South Bend Silver Hawks players
Tennessee Smokies players
Tigres del Licey players
Toros de Tijuana players
Trenton Thunder players
Tucson Sidewinders players
Vaqueros Laguna players